Jack Napier (born October 20, 1972) is an American pornographic actor and director. He is of African American and Puerto-Rican descent. He started his adult film career in 1999, and has since appeared in over 350 films. In 2011, he was inducted into the Urban X Awards Hall of Fame.

Career
Napier began directing films in 2000, and has directed movies in series such as There's Something About Jack, Jack Napier's Ridin Dirty, and Black Bottom Girls. His movie It's Big, It's Black, It's Jack was nominated for Best Interracial Release at the 2007 AVN Awards. In 2007 he signed an exclusive two-year contract to perform and direct with Vouyer Media, and has consecutive awards for Best Interracial Series with "It's Big It's Black It's Jack" at the 2009, 2010 and 2011 AVN Awards.

As of 2015, Napier has been inactive following a near-fatal motorcycle accident.

Awards
2009 AVN Award – Best Interracial Series – It’s Big It’s Black It’s Jack
2010 AVN Award – Best Interracial Series – It’s Big It’s Black It’s Jack
2011 AVN Award – Best Interracial Series – It’s Big It’s Black It’s Jack
2011 Urban X Awards Hall of Fame

References

External links

 
 

1972 births
Living people
American male pornographic film actors
Hispanic and Latino American pornographic film actors
African-American pornographic film actors
American people of Puerto Rican descent
Pornographic film actors from California
21st-century African-American people
20th-century African-American people